The 2020–21 Moldovan "A" Division was the 30th season of Moldovan football's second-tier league. The season started on 24 July 2020 and ended on 25 May 2021.

Teams

Season summary

League table

Results
Teams will play each other twice (once home, once away).

Results by round
The following table represents the teams game results in each round.

Top goalscorers

Clean sheets

Notes

References

External links
Divizia A - Moldova - Results, fixtures, tables and news - divizia-a.md

Moldovan Liga 1 seasons
Moldova 2
2020–21 in Moldovan football